No Ordinary Baby, also known as After Amy, is a 2001 television film starring Bridget Fonda. The film revolves around a reporter played by Fonda covering the birth of the first cloned human and the public furor that ensues, along with reputation troubles faced by the doctor involved. Fonda was nominated for the best actress (miniseries or TV film) award at the 2002 Golden Globes for her role in the film.

The film is based on the short story "Carbon Copy", by Richard Kadrey.

References

External links

2001 television films
2001 films
2001 drama films
Films about cloning
Films directed by Peter Werner
American drama television films
2000s English-language films
2000s American films